Mauricio Borensztein (27 April 1927 – 11 January 1996), known by the stage name Tato Bores, was an Argentine film, theatre and television comedian, who specialized in political humor. His ironic TV monologues, delivered at a fast pace, became a reference point for generations of Argentines.

Biography 
He was born into a family of Polish Jewish heritage. He took his first steps into the humor field in 1957, after the fall of Juan Perón, debuting in state-owned Channel 7. When in character, he wore dress coat, white bow tie and a deliberately badly cut wig, and waved a cigar. Besides the monologues, at some point during each show he pretended to dial the number of the Casa Rosada and speak to the President (whoever it was at the time), asking pointed questions or commenting on uncomfortable news.

Near the end of his life, Borensztein abandoned the weekly show format and resorted to "special programmes" every month or sometimes more often. In one of these, he appeared as Dr. Helmut Strasse, "argentinologist", an archeologist specialized in the lost land of Argentina, which had sunk into the Atlantic Ocean 500 years before the fictional time frame of the show. The show was a humorous mockumentary about the downfall of Argentina where Borensztein, speaking in a mixture of Yiddish, German and some odd words in Spanish, overdubbed into straight Spanish by a narrator, commented on the latest findings and theories while he toured a digging site.

Before the broadcast of one of the programmes, federal judge María Servini de Cubría was warned that the show contained an ironic comment about a ridiculously low fine she had received for mishandling a case. Servini ordered the offending segment to be cut out, and forbade Borensztein to mention her name. This violated free speech, since the programme had not been broadcast and she had not verified it was criminally offensive. Borensztein received overwhelming support from the artistic community of Argentina, but respected the judicial order, from then on referring to the judge as "the unnameable" or as Jueza Barubudubudía (intended as a nonsensical yet transparent rhyme of "Servini de Cubría") until the censorship was lifted.

Professional work

Television

Films
 Un pecado por mes (1949)
 La comedia inmortal (1951)
 The Path to Crime (1951)
 Esta es mi vida (1952)
 Mala gente (1952)
 Por cuatro días locos (1953)
 Casada y señorita (1954)
 Vida nocturna (1955)
 Vacaciones en la Argentina (1960)
 El Asalto (1960)
 Propiedad (1962)
 El televisor (1962)
 Viaje de una noche de verano (1965)
 Disputas en la cama (1972)
 Departamento compartido (1980)
 Amante para dos (1981)

Family
He is the father of Alejandro Borensztein, Sebastián Borensztein and Marina Borensztein.

See also
Argentine humour

Sources
 
 
 Youtube channel

1927 births
1996 deaths
Argentine Ashkenazi Jews
Argentine male film actors
Argentine male television actors
Jewish Argentine male actors
Jewish Argentine comedians
Argentine people of Polish-Jewish descent
Illustrious Citizens of Buenos Aires
Argentine political satire
Argentine satirists
20th-century Argentine male actors
Argentine male radio actors
Male actors from Buenos Aires
20th-century comedians